The Carpathian gudgeon (Gobio carpathicus) is a species of gudgeon, a small freshwater in the family Cyprinidae. It is widespread in Europe in the Tisza system, Danube drainage in Ukraine. Freshwater demersal fish, up to 12.0 cm long.

Etymology
Gobio is Latin for gobius which means gudgeon.

References

Sources
 

carpathicus
Fish described in 1925
Cyprinid fish of Europe